William Burck (4 February 1848, Monnickendam, the Netherlands – 25 September 1910, Leiden, the Netherlands) was a Dutch botanist. He obtained a doctorate from Leiden University in 1874. In 1881 he became Assistant Director of the then Buitenzorg Botanical Gardens (now Bogor Botanical Gardens) in Java. He collected a large number of plant specimens from locations including the Padang Highlands of western Sumatra. The genus Burckella is named for him.

He was elected a corresponding member of the Royal Netherlands Academy of Arts and Sciences in 1885 and resigned in 1903. He was re-admitted as member in 1907.

References

1848 births
1910 deaths
19th-century Dutch botanists
Dutch phytopathologists
Leiden University alumni
Members of the Royal Netherlands Academy of Arts and Sciences
People from Monnickendam